is a Japanese track and field athlete. He competed in the men's triple jump at the 1984 Summer Olympics. He is currently a professor of sports science at Tokai University.

References

1955 births
Living people
Place of birth missing (living people)
Japanese male triple jumpers
Olympic male triple jumpers
Olympic athletes of Japan
Athletes (track and field) at the 1984 Summer Olympics
Asian Games silver medalists for Japan
Asian Games medalists in athletics (track and field)
Athletes (track and field) at the 1982 Asian Games
Medalists at the 1982 Asian Games
Academic staff of Tokai University
Japan Championships in Athletics winners